Juan de Aragón was a Roman Catholic prelate who served as Archbishop of Zaragoza (1458–1475).

Biography
Juan de Aragón was born in Spain in 1439, the illegitimate son of John II of Aragon.
On 30 June 1458, he was appointed during the papacy of Pope Callixtus III as Archbishop of Zaragoza.
He served as Archbishop of Zaragoza until his death on 19 November 1475.

While bishop, he was the principal consecrator of Pedro Baldó, Bishop of Segorbe-Albarracin (1461); and Jaime Perez de Valencia, Titular Bishop of Christopolis and Auxiliary Bishop of Valencia (1469).

References

External links and additional sources
 (for Chronology of Bishops) 
 (for Chronology of Bishops) 

15th-century Roman Catholic bishops in the Kingdom of Aragon
Bishops appointed by Pope Callixtus III
1439 births
1475 deaths
Sons of kings